Misael Argeñal (Jacaleapa, El Paraíso, January 21, 1954) is the president of Universidad Cristiana de Honduras, which was founded by Ministerio La Cosecha (International Church of the Foursquare Gospel).

References

Honduran educators
Living people
1951 births
Honduran clergy
Television evangelists
Honduran Pentecostal pastors
People from El Paraíso Department
Members of the Foursquare Church